Cyber Empires (known as Steel Empire in Europe) is a strategy/top-view fighting game produced by Silicon Knights. The game was produced in MS-DOS, Atari ST and Amiga versions, and was originally released in March 1992. The current copyright holder was Strategic Simulations, Inc., which later became part of Ubisoft.

Gameplay
The game has two basic components. The first requires the player to engage in Risk-like strategic decision-making with the goal of conquering the given land mass. The player raises cyborg armies to accomplish this goal. During the second basic component of the game, the top-down battle mode, players can choose to assume manual control of one cyborg in their army during offensive or defensive battle sessions, or let the computer simulate the battle behind the scenes to much more predictable outcomes. This allows players to play only the Risk-style board game component of the game. The opposite, battles only, is also possible. Cyber Empires innovated by mixing strategy with arcade action on a global scale.

The game offers a total of nine different cyborgs from which the user can create an army of up to 10 units, that is no more 10 units may occupy one country. The units range from the small fast mercury capable of little damage but a high speed, to the Titan which is the ultimate cyborg capable of long-range missile attacks and short-range auto-cannon attacks.

The strategy part of the game allows the user to place capitols in any countries occupied by their troops. Countries with capitols in them create extra revenue every turn and can be built upon. The buildings includes fortifications, factories and factory upgrades. Fortifications comes in 3 varieties: light, medium and heavy, but can only protect a country if at least one cyborg is present. Factories come in 3 varieties also, they can have 1, 2 or 4 bays. The number of bays a factory has determined the number of cyborgs it can build at once. The upgrade level of a factory, on the other hand, determines how fast an individual cyborg can be built.

Reception
Computer Gaming World warned that Cyber Empires was an action game with strategic elements and that it was not well suited for strategy-only players. The magazine called it "a solid game. It has nothing to rave about and nothing that hobbles it", with "adequate" graphics and sound, and recommended the game to action gamers who were "fans of BattleTech, Robotech and Giant Robot universes". A 1994 survey of strategic space games set in the year 2000 and later gave the game two-plus stars out of five.

References

External links 

The history of Silicon Knights

1992 video games
Action video games
Amiga games
Atari ST games
Computer wargames
DOS games
Science fiction video games
Silicon Knights games
Strategic Simulations games
Turn-based strategy video games
Video games developed in Canada
Video games scored by Richard Joseph
Single-player video games